Igor Olegovich Shchyogolev (born November 10, 1965) is a Russian politician. From May 2008 to 20 May 2012, he has served as the Russian Minister of Telecommunications.

Early life and education 
Shchyogolev was born in Vinnitsa, Ukraine and went to the Moscow State Linguistic University (1982–1984) and the Leipzig University (1984–1988), graduating as a philologist.

Career 
After graduating from university, he joined the Telegraph Agency of the Soviet Union (later, following the dissolution of the Soviet Union, the Information Telegraph Agency of Russia or ITAR-TASS) in their American office until 1993. He then moved to Paris as a foreign correspondent, and in 1997 moved back to Russia as deputy editor-in-chief and political correspondent of ITAR-TASS's main news service.

Government service 
In 1998, Shchyogolev left ITAR-TASS to work for the Russian government, initially as deputy head of the government corps of press officer, then briefly as Yevgeniy Primakov's press secretary before returning to lead the press officer corps. In early 2000, he was appointed as press secretary for Vladimir Putin, then-acting President of Russia, where he stayed until the end of 2001 when he became head of Presidential Protocol, co-ordinating presidential trips overseas and in Russia. In 2004, his job was expanded to be head of Kremlin Protocol, where he stayed until he was appointed "Minister of Communications and Mass Media" as part of Putin's second cabinet on 12 May 2008, replacing Leonid Reiman.

U.S. sanctions target 

References 

1965 births
Living people
1st class Active State Councillors of the Russian Federation
Government ministers of Russia
Russian people of Ukrainian descent
Russian individuals subject to the U.S. Department of the Treasury sanctions
Russian individuals subject to European Union sanctions